Princess Olga Alexandrovna Yurievskaya (7 November 187310 August 1925) was the natural daughter of Alexander II of Russia by his mistress (later his wife), Princess Catherine Dolgorukova. In 1880, she was legitimated by her parents' morganatic marriage.

After her father's assassination in 1881, her mother brought her up in France. In 1895, she married a German nobleman, becoming Countess Merenberg, and spent most of the rest of her life in Germany.

Early life

Olga was born at Saint Petersburg, Russia, on 7 November 1873, while her mother was still the mistress of Tsar Alexander II. Her parents' morganatic marriage on 6 July 1880 legitimated her, and she acquired the surname of Yurievsky, the title of Princess (knyagina) and the style of Serene Highness (Svetlost).

Her father was assassinated in March 1881, when she was seven, and after that her mother took her three surviving children, Olga, George, and Catherine, to live in France. A second brother, Boris, had died in infancy.

France and Germany
Olga's mother took a house in Paris and later others on the French Riviera. In 1891, she bought a house in Nice which she called the Villa Georges, in the boulevard Dubouchage. In France, the family was able to afford some twenty servants and a private railway carriage. However, the immediate family of the new Tsar, Nicholas II, looked on Catherine and her children with some disdain.

On 12 May 1895, in Nice, Olga married Count George-Nicholas von Merenberg (1871–1948), a grandson of Alexander Pushkin, becoming Countess  Merenberg and the sister-in-law of Sophie of Merenberg, the morganatic wife of Grand Duke Michael Mikhailovich of Russia. Catherine asked the Tsar to be the sponsor of the wedding, but his mother, Maria Feodorovna, was appalled by the idea, so Nicholas declined. He later recalled that Catherine had been offended.

Most of the rest of Olga’s life was spent in Germany, including the war years of 1914 to 1918. She had three children, one of whom died in infancy, and herself died in 1925 at Wiesbaden, aged 51.

Children

Count Alexander Adolf (1896–1897)
Count George Michael (1897–1965), who married firstly in 1926 (divorced 1928) Polett von Köver de Györgyös-Szent-Miklos, and secondly in 1940 Elizabeth Müller-Uri (1903–1963)
Countess Clotilde von Merenberg (born 1941), married 1965 Enno von Rintelen
Alexander Enno von Rintelen (born 1966)
Georg Nicholas von Rintelen (born 1970)
Gregor von Rintelen (born 1972)
Countess Olga Ekaterina Adda (1898–1983), who married in 1923 Count Mikhail Tarielovich Loris-Melikov (1900–1980)
Alexander Mikhailovich Loris-Melikov (born 1926), married in 1958 Micheline Selina Pryunier
Anna Alexandrovna Loris-Melikova (born 1959)
Dominika Alexandrovna Loris-Melikova (born 1961)
Natalya Alexandrovna Loris-Melikova (born 1962)
Mikhail Alexandrovich Loris-Melikov (born 1964)

Ancestors

Notes

1870s births
1925 deaths
19th-century women from the Russian Empire
20th-century Russian women
People from Sankt-Peterburgsky Uyezd
German countesses
Russian princesses
Morganatic issue of Romanovs
Emigrants from the Russian Empire to France
Emigrants from the Russian Empire to Germany
House of Romanov in exile
Daughters of Russian emperors
Children of Alexander II of Russia
Illegitimate children of emperors